Nopoiulus is a genus of millipedes belonging to the family Blaniulidae.

The species of this genus are found in Europe and Northern America.

Species:
 Nopoiulus ammonites Enghoff, 1984 
 Nopoiulus atticus (Verhoeff, 1925)

References

Julida
Millipede genera